Union sportive de la médina d'Alger is an Algerian professional football club based in Algiers, Algiers Province. The club was formed in Casbah in 1937 as Union Sportive Musulmane d'Alger, and played their first competitive match in 1937, when they entered the 1937–38 Ligue d'Alger Troisième Division. The club was renamed Union sportive de la médina d'Alger in 1989.

Each player's details include the duration of his USM Alger career, his typical playing position while with the club, and the number of games played and goals scored in all senior competitive matches.

One player, Noureddine Daham, fell one short of 100 appearances for USM Alger. The list includes six players who are still contracted to the club, and so can add to their totals.

Key
The list is ordered first by date of debut, and then if necessary in alphabetical order.
Statistics are correct up to and including the match played on August 24, 2021. Where a player left the club permanently after this date, his statistics are updated to his date of leaving.

Players

Bold Still playing competitive football in USM Alger.

Footnotes

References

 
USM Alger
Association football player non-biographical articles